Sauraha is a village of Ratnanagar Municipality in Chitwan District and Chitwan Valley, in Bagmati Province of southern Nepal.

Geography
The village is the eastern gateway to the nearby and large Chitwan National Park, that protects part of the Terai-Duar savanna and grasslands ecoregion.

Beginning literally as a small and quaint village of daub huts, houses and hotels, it has grown into a small town with hotels, resorts, restaurants, internet cafes, and gift shops.

Travel
Sauraha has good road access for private-rental vehicles.

By air
Air connections to Sauraha  are  through Bharatpur Airport, with regular daily air services from Pokhara and Kathmandu. The airport lies just 15 kilometer to the west of Sauraha. Will need to change to bus, jeep, taxi for connection to Sauraha.

By bus
Via Kathmandu — there are three types of buses available. Cheaper Birganj bound buses which will drop you at Tadi Bazaar about 4 kilometers north of Sunauli where you can easily get local bus, taxi, rickshaws, tanga/pony carts. These second bit more expensive type is the direct tourist buses that are no more comfortable than normal intercity except they are full of tourists. A third type are more comfortable air-conditioned buses (Greenline, etc.). All buses will travel via Mugling, Narayangarh/Bharatpur, Tadi Bazaar, Sauraha; (4–5 hours trip). 
Via Sunauli / Bhairahawa — on eastern bound (Birganj/Biratnagar) buses traveling through Butwal, Bharatpur, Tadi Bazaar. Change to local bus, jeep, pony cart, or rickshaw to Sauraha (3 – 4 hours trip).
Via Pokhara — direct tourist buses are available via Mugling, Narayangarh / Bharatpur, Tadi Bazaar, Sauraha (3 – 4 hours trip).

Tourism
Chitwan National Park
Tharu Museum 
Rafting
Devghat — as the Hindu pilgrimage destination
International elephant polo games
 The Elephant Breeding Center
 Night Tower
 Wildlife safaris by foot, jeep and elephant
 Tharu cultural show of the Tharu people

References

Populated places in Chitwan District
Tourism in Nepal